Waterkeeper Alliance is a worldwide network of environmental organizations founded in 1999 in response to a growing movement of organizations with such names as Riverkeeper, Baykeeper and Soundkeeper. By December 2019, the group said it had grown to 350 members in 46 countries, with half the membership outside the U.S.; the alliance had added 200 groups in the last five years. 

The original Riverkeeper, organized in 1983, started on the Hudson River in New York, in response to the destructive industrial pollution that was destroying the river. It soon was followed by Long Island Soundkeeper (led by Terry Backer), Delaware Riverkeeper, San Francisco Baykeeper, New York/New Jersey Baykeeper, and others. Today, Waterkeeper Alliance, which is based out of Manhattan, unites all Waterkeeper organizations, coordinating and covering issues affecting Waterkeepers that work to protect rivers, lakes, bays, sounds, and other water bodies around the world. In the United States, the east coast is strongly represented; only 52 of the 180 groups cover watersheds west of the Mississippi.

In June 2019, in a collaboration with travel site Culture Trip, the alliance honored twenty global "Waterkeeper Warriors", advocates behind successful clean-water battles of the past two decades. In addition to American activists, more than half of the honorees were people from other countries such as The Bahamas, Bangladesh, Cambodia, Chile, the People's Republic of China, Colombia, Nepal, Peru, Senegal, and the United Kingdom.

Notes

External links
 

Water organizations in the United States
Environmental organizations based in New York City
Water resource policy
Environmental organizations established in 1999
Water conservation in the United States
1999 establishments in New York (state)